Nupserha marginella is a species of beetle in the family Cerambycidae. It was described by Henry Walter Bates in 1873. It is known from Japan, Russia, Vietnam, Mongolia, China, North Korea, and South Korea.

Subspecies
 Nupserha marginella marginella (Bates, 1873)
 Nupserha marginella binhensis Pic, 1926

References

marginella
Beetles described in 1873